Mecistophylla ebenopasta is a species of snout moth in the genus Mecistophylla. It was described by Turner in 1904, and is known from Queensland, Australia.

References

Moths described in 1904
Tirathabini